Giacomo Promontorio (Genoa, 1508 - Genoa, 1578) was the 58th Doge of the Republic of Genoa.

Biography 
Promontorio was elected to the dogal title on January 4, 1553, the thirteenth in biennial succession and the fifty-eighth in republican history. Under his mandate, the Jesuits settled in Genoa and began organizing and founding public schools. After his office on January 4, 1555 he served the republic in other state offices. He died in Genoa in 1578 and was buried inside the church of Santa Caterina.

See also 

 Republic of Genoa
 Doge of Genoa

References 

16th-century Doges of Genoa
1508 births
1578 deaths